Expire was an American hardcore punk band from Milwaukee, Wisconsin, United States, active from 2009 to 2017. They were signed to Bridge 9 Records.

History
Expire was formed in 2009. They released three full-length albums, three EPs and one split. They released their first full length, titled Pendulum Swings in 2012. They released their second full length, titled Pretty Low in 2014. Pretty Low peaked at No. 175 on the Billboard 200 chart. In August 2016, the band announced plans to break-up following the release of a new album, titled With Regret, and a few international tours. On March 11, 2017, they played their final show to a sold-out crowd in their hometown of Milwaukee.

Zach Dear and Marcus Boldt would go on to form the band Stone, while Caleb Murphy would go on to form the band Inclination. In January of 2018, Stone disbanded following a large wave of sexual assault accusations against Zach Dear, resulting in all members of both Expire and Stone publicly denouncing Zach and donating all band funds to RAINN.

Members
 Josh Kelting – vocals
 Zach Dear – guitar
 Marcus Boldt – drums
 Caleb Murphy – bass

Discography
Studio albums
 Pendulum Swings (2012)
 Pretty Low (2014)
 With Regret (2016)

EPs
 Grim Rhythm (2010)
 Suffer the Cycle (2011)
 Sink with Me (2012)

Splits
 Expire / Soul Control (2013)

Compilation albums
 Old Songs (2016)

References

Hardcore punk groups from Wisconsin
Bridge 9 Records artists